Smith Islands is a national park in North Queensland, Australia, 862 km northwest of Brisbane.

See also

 Protected areas of Queensland

References 

Islands of Queensland
National parks of Queensland
North Queensland